Watkins Commission may refer to:

 the U.S. President's Commission on the HIV Epidemic, formed in 1987 
 the United States Commission on Ocean Policy, formed in 2000